Matt Fodge (born September 16, 1986) is a former American football punter. He was signed by the Dallas Cowboys as an undrafted free agent in 2009. He played college football at Oklahoma State.

After his college career he has served as vice president of Gleco Plating in Rowlett, Texas under his father, president Jeff Fodge.

College career
Fodge played college football at Oklahoma State. He won the Ray Guy Award during the 2008 college football season.

Professional career
Fodge was signed by the Dallas Cowboys on June 15, 2009. He was released before the start of training camp.

References

External links
 Oklahoma State Cowboys bio

1986 births
Living people
American football punters
Oklahoma State Cowboys football players
Dallas Cowboys players
Players of American football from Texas
People from Garland, Texas